Kozlov is a municipality and village in Jihlava District in the Vysočina Region of the Czech Republic. It has about 500 inhabitants.

History
The first written mention of Kozlov is a 1451 deed issued by the abbey of Třebíč.

Notable people
Matthias Sindelar (1903–1939), Austrian footballer

References

Villages in Jihlava District